Play Me Out can refer to:

Play Me Out (Glenn Hughes album)
Play Me Out (Helen Reddy album)